Mordellistena buxtoni is a beetle in the genus Mordellistena of the family Mordellidae. It was described in 1928 by Blair.

References

buxtoni
Beetles described in 1928